Zinnia Flower is a 2015 Taiwanese film starring Karena Lam, Stone, Ko Chia-yen, Umin Boya, Bryan Chang, Nana Lee and Gen Yan Tsai. The film was released on October 8, 2015. It was chosen as the closing film of the Taipei Film Festival in 2015. It is based on the story of how director Tom Lin Shu-yu and a woman get over the pain of losing their loved ones during the 100 days following their deaths. Karena Lam won the Golden Horse Award for Best Leading Actress for her role in the film, as well as being nominated for the Asian Film Award for Best Actress.

Plot 

Yu Wei and Shin Min lose their partners in the same multi-car crash. To cope, Yu Wei drinks excessively, while Shin Min cooks the recipes her fiancé had left day after day.

Cast 
Karena Lam as Shin Min; loses her fiancé
 Stone as Yu Wei Chang; loses his wife, Xiao Wen, and his son
 Ko Chia-yen as Xiao Wen; Yu Wei's wife
 Umin Boya as Ren You, Shin Min's fiancé
 Chang Shu-hao as Ren Yi, Ren You's younger brother
 Nana Lee as Shin Ting, Shin Min's younger sister

Release 
The film premiered at the Taipei Film Festival in July 2015 before being released to general Taiwanese audiences in theaters early October.

An emotional sex scene was cut from the theatrical release after mixed reactions at the Taipei Film Festival. Lin said that he thought the discourse was leading audiences away from the film's focus on the grieving process.

Soundtrack

Awards and nominations 
52nd Golden Horse Awards

10th Asian Film Awards

19th Tallinn Black Nights Film Festival

9th CinemAsia Film Festival

References 

 Wen Tang Cheng, The Moment When We Hug: Less grassroots, more warmth. Liberty Times. 2014-09-26
 Maverick, Zinnia Flower: the opening and the closing film of Taipei film festival. UDN news. 2015-05-14
 Karena Lam almost forgot to thank her husband when winning the Best Actress Award. CAN news. 2015-11-21

2015 films
2010s Mandarin-language films
2015 drama films
Taiwanese drama films
Films set in Okinawa Prefecture
Films directed by Tom Lin